FRZ may refer to:
 Fritzlar Air Base, in Hesse, Germany
 Frizzled, a protein
 Flight Restricted Zone, part of the Washington, DC Metropolitan Area Special Flight Rules Area